Filab (also Romanized as Fīlāb) is a village in Quchan Atiq Rural District, in the Central District of Quchan County, Razavi Khorasan Province, Iran. At the 2006 census, its population was 344, in 103 families.

Famous natives
 Moslem Eskandar-Filabi, Olympic wrestler

References 

Populated places in Quchan County